Two submarines of the United States Navy have borne the name USS Finback, named in honor of the finback, a common whale of the Atlantic coast of the United States.

 The first , was a Gato-class submarine, commissioned in 1942 and stricken in 1958.
 The second , was a Sturgeon-class submarine, commissioned in 1970 and stricken in 1997.

United States Navy ship names